Pedro Fuentes (born 17 January 1957) is a Cuban weightlifter. He competed in the men's featherweight event at the 1976 Summer Olympics.

References

1957 births
Living people
Cuban male weightlifters
Olympic weightlifters of Cuba
Weightlifters at the 1976 Summer Olympics
Place of birth missing (living people)
20th-century Cuban people